Taylor Townsend was the defending champion, but she chose not to participate.

Allie Kiick won the title, defeating Katerina Stewart in the final, 7–5, 6–7(3–7), 7–5.

Seeds

Main draw

Finals

Top half

Bottom half

References 
 Main draw

Boyd Tinsley Women's Clay Court Classic - Singles